Cruel Smile is a 2002 album by Elvis Costello and the Imposters. It consists of B-sides and leftover material from the When I Was Cruel sessions.

Track listing
All songs written by Elvis Costello except where indicated.

 "Smile" (Japanese A-side) (Charlie Chaplin, Geoff Parsons, John Turner) – 3:05
 "When I Was Cruel (No. 1)" – 4:16
 "Almost Blue" (Live in Sydney) – 5:04
 "15 Petals" (Live in Sydney) – 5:35
 "Spooky Girlfriend" (Live at KFOG, San Francisco]) – 4:42
 "Honeyhouse" (Cruel No. 2) – 5:07
 "Revolution Doll" – 3:44
 "Peroxide Side" (Blunt Cut) – 3:48
 "Oh Well" (Costello, K "Q-Tip" Fareed) – 2:52
 "The Imposter vs. the Floodtide (Dust and Petals)" – 3:58
 "Watching the Detectives/My Funny Valentine" (Live in Tokyo) (Costello, Richard Rodgers, Lorenz Hart) – 7:09
 "Dust" (Live in Melbourne) – 6:39
 "Uncomplicated" (Live in Tokyo) – 4:46
 "Smile" (Japanese B-side) (Chaplin, Parsons, Turner) – 3:32
 "Soul for Hire" (live in Tokyo) (unlisted track) – 6:36

Personnel 
Elvis Costello - vocals, orchestration 
Steve Averill – design
Elena Barere – concertmaster
Joey Baron – drums
Ciáran Cahil – producer, mixing
Greg Cohen – bass
Anthony Coleman – piano
Jill Dell'Abate – music coordinator
Enrico DiCecco – violin
Jesse Dylan – photography
Phil Edwards – engineer
Davey Faragher – bass guitar
Barry Finclair – violin
Kevin Killen – producer
Jeanne LeBlanc – cello
Vince Lionti – viola
Richard Locker – cello
Kieran Lynch – producer, mixing
Roy Nathanson – alto saxophone
Steve Nieve – piano, keyboards, string ensemble
Leo Pearson – producer, mixing
Renaud Pion – clarinet, soprano saxophone, Cor Anglais
Marc Ribot – guitar
Jeff Schmidt – mixing
Vincent Ségal – cello
Richard Sortomme – violin
Pete Thomas – drums

Charts

References

Elvis Costello albums
2002 albums
Island Records albums